Anastassiya Rodina (born 30 June 1991) is a Kazakhstani handball player. She plays for the club Almaty Region Handball and is member of the Kazakhstani national team. She competed at the 2015 World Women's Handball Championship in Denmark.

References

1991 births
Living people
Kazakhstani female handball players
Asian Games medalists in handball
Handball players at the 2014 Asian Games
Place of birth missing (living people)
Asian Games bronze medalists for Kazakhstan
Medalists at the 2014 Asian Games
21st-century Kazakhstani women